Pseudocoris is a genus of wrasses native to the eastern Indian Ocean and the western Pacific Ocean.

Species
There are currently 9 recognized species in this genus:
 Pseudocoris aequalis J. E. Randall & F. M. Walsh, 2008
 Pseudocoris aurantiofasciata Fourmanoir, 1971 (Rust-banded wrasse)
 Pseudocoris bleekeri (Hubrecht, 1876) (Philippines wrasse)
 Pseudocoris hemichrysos J. E. Randall, Connell & Victor, 2015 
 Pseudocoris heteroptera (Bleeker, 1857) (Torpedo wrasse)
 Pseudocoris occidentalis J. E. Randall, Connell & Victor, 2015 
 Pseudocoris ocellata J. P. Chen & K. T. Shao, 1995
 Pseudocoris petila G. R. Allen & Erdmann, 2012
 Pseudocoris yamashiroi (P. Y. Schmidt, 1931) (Redspot wrasse)

References

Labridae
Marine fish genera
Taxa named by Pieter Bleeker